Buccinulum is a genus of sea snails, marine gastropod molluscs in the family Buccinidae, the true whelks.

Description
Buccinulum are small to medium-sized marine snails. Species vary significantly in shell sculpture and colouration and can be difficult to distinguish from one another.

Distribution
The majority of extant and fossil species are from New Zealand. Most species are commonly abundant  within the intertidal and shallow subtidal zone of New Zealand beaches.

Evolution
Buccinulum is closely related to the genus Aeneator.

Species
Species within the genus Buccinulum include:

 Buccinulum bountyensis (Powell, 1929)
 Buccinulum brunobrianoi (Parth, 1993)
 Buccinulum colensoi (Suter, 1908)
 † Buccinulum caudatum (Powell, 1929)
 † Buccinulum compactum compactum (Suter, 1917)
 † Buccinulum compactum tetleyi (Powell & Batrum, 1929)
 Buccinulum flexicostatum Dell, 1956
 Buccinulum fuscozonatum (Suter, 1908)
 † Buccinulum grindleyi (Marwick, 1965)
 Buccinulum linea linea  (Martyn, 1784)
 Buccinulum linea flexicostatum (Dell, 1956)
 Buccinulum lineare (Reeve, 1846)
 Buccinulum littorinoides (Reeve, 1846)
 † Buccinulum longicolle (Powell, 1929)
 Buccinulum mariae (Powell, 1940)
 † Buccinulum medium (Hutton,  1885)
 Buccinulum otagoensis (Powell, 1929)
 Buccinulum pallidum pallidum (Finlay, 1928)
 Buccinulum pallidum powelli (Ponder, 1971)
 † Buccinulum pangoides (Beu, 1973)
 Buccinulum pertinax pertinax (von Martens, 1878)
 Buccinulum pertinax finlayi (Powell, 1929)
 † Buccinulum pertinax pansum (Finlay, 1965)
 Buccinulum ponsonbyi (G. B. Sowerby III, 1889)
 † Buccinulum protensum  (Powell, 1929)
 Buccinulum queketti (E. A. Smith, 1901)
 † Buccinulum rigidum  (Powell, 1929)
 Buccinulum robustum (Powell, 1929)
 † Buccinulum tuberculatum  (Powell, 1929)
 Buccinulum turrita (Tenison-Woods, 1875)
 Buccinulum venusta (Powell, 1929)
 Buccinulum vittatum vittatum (Quoy & Gaimard, 1833)
 Buccinulum vittatum bicinctum (Hutton, 1873)
 Buccinulum vittatum littorinoides (Reeve, 1846)
 † Buccinulum vittatum tepikiensis (Powell, 1929)
 † Buccinulum wairapaensis  (Powell, 1938)

Species brought into synonymy
 † Buccinulum caelatum Powell, 1929: synonym of Buccinulum linea (Martyn, 1784)
 Buccinulum clarckei (Tenison Woods, 1875): synonym of Tasmeuthria clarkei (Tenison Woods, 1876)
 Buccinulum corneum (Linnaeus, 1758): synonym of Euthria cornea (Linnaeus, 1758)
 † Buccinulum ectypum Marwick, 1931: synonym of † Gemmocolus ectypa (Marwick, 1931)  (original combination)
 Buccinulum finlayi Powell, 1929: synonym of Buccinulum pertinax finlayi Powell, 1929 (original combination)
 Buccinulum heteromorphum Powell, 1929: synonym of Buccinulum vittatum (Quoy & Gaimard, 1833)
 Buccinulum kaikouraense Powell, 1929: synonym of Buccinulum littorinoides (Reeve, 1846)
 Buccinulum maketuense Powell, 1929: synonym of Buccinulum vittatum (Quoy & Gaimard, 1833)
 Buccinulum marwicki Finlay, 1928: synonym of Buccinulum pertinax (E. von Martens, 1878)
 Buccinulum marwicki marwicki Finlay, 1928: synonym of Buccinulum pertinax (E. von Martens, 1878)
 Buccinulum motutaraense Powell, 1929: synonym of Buccinulum vittatum (Quoy & Gaimard, 1833)
 Buccinulum multilineum Powell, 1929: synonym of Buccinulum linea (Martyn, 1784)
 Buccinulum mutabile Powell, 1929: synonym of Buccinulum pertinax (E. von Martens, 1878)
 † Buccinulum pangoides Beu, 1973 : synonym of † Euthria pangoides (Beu, 1973) 
 † Buccinulum scottae Marwick, 1965 : synonym of † Taron scottae (Marwick, 1965)  (original combination)
 Buccinulum squalidum Powell, 1929: synonym of Buccinulum linea (Martyn, 1784)
 Buccinulum strebeli (Suter, 1908): synonym of Buccinulum vittatum littorinoides (Reeve, 1846): synonym of Buccinulum littorinoides (Reeve, 1846)
 Buccinulum strebeli strebeli (Suter, 1908): synonym of Buccinulum littorinoides (Reeve, 1846)
 Buccinulum sufflatum Finlay, 1926: synonym of Buccinulum linea (Martyn, 1784)
 Buccinulum tenuistriatum Powell, 1929: synonym of Buccinulum pallidum Finlay, 1928
 Buccinulum waitangiensis Powell, 1933: synonym of Buccinulum linea (Martyn, 1784)

References

External links
 Revised descriptions of New Zealand Cenozoic Mollusca from Beu and Maxwell (1990)
 Checklist of the Recent Mollusca Recorded from the New Zealand Exclusive Economic Zone

Further reading
 Powell A. W. B., New Zealand Mollusca, William Collins Publishers Ltd, Auckland, New Zealand 1979 

Buccinidae
Gastropod genera